El Valle is one of 12 parishes (administrative divisions) in Carreño, a municipality within the province and autonomous community of Asturias, in northern Spain.

The postal code is 33438.

Villages and hamlets
 El Cuitu
 Fontefría
 Llacín
 La Maquila
 La Mata
 Nozalín
 El Palacio
 Ramos
 Santolaya
 La Sierra
 Sopeñes
 La Torre
 La Vega
 Xanes
 Zancornio

Parishes in Carreño